Coleostephus is a genus of flowering plants in the family Asteraceae (daisy family).

 Species
 Coleostephus multicaulis (Desf.) Durieu - Algeria
 Coleostephus myconis (L.) Cass. - Spain, Portugal, France, Corsica, Sardinia, Italy, Yugoslavia, Greece, Algeria, Morocco
 Coleostephus paludosus (Durieu) Alavi - Spain, Portugal, Corsica, Sardinia, Italy, Sicily, Algeria, Tunisia, Libya

References

Anthemideae
Asteraceae genera